Minninglow Goods Yard was a goods station located on the Cromford and High Peak Railway near the villages of Aldwark, Pikehall and Longcliffe in Derbyshire. Mostly for moving mineral and quarry traffic. It closed in 1967 along with the rest of the line. And today, nothing remains of the goods yard. The trackbed now forms part of the High Peak Trail. The site of Minninglow is also now a landmark on the High Peak Trail.

References 

Disused railway stations in Derbyshire
Railway stations in Great Britain closed in 1967